Clyde–Savannah Central School District is a public school district in New York State, USA that serves approximately 870 students in the villages of Clyde and Savannah in Wayne County.

The average class size is 17 students (all grades).

Michael C. Hayden is the Superintendent of Schools.

Former superintendents 
George Batterson–?-2001
Paul R. Doyle–2001–2004
Richard A. Drahms–2004–2006
Marilyn Barr–2006–2009
Theresa Pulos 2009-2014

Performance
The District's 82% graduation rate exceeds the State Standard of 55%.

Clyde-Savannah High School

Clyde-Savannah High School, formerly Clyde-Savannah Junior/Senior High School, is located at 215 Glasgow Street and serves grades 9 through 12. The current principal is Dr. Craig Pawlak.

History
Until fall 2011, the high school served grades 7 through 12. After the closure of the middle school building, the middle school moved to the high school building and the 7th and 8th grades were then considered to be part of the middle school.

Selected former principals
Thomas J. Castellano–1981-1989 (Social Studies teacher - Clyde-Savannah High School, retired)
Anthony J. Patanzo–?-2005
Matthew Motala–2005–2006

Aerial View
Aerial map

Clyde-Savannah Middle School

Clyde-Savannah Middle School is located in the same building as the high school.

History
The Middle School, formerly known as Savannah Elementary School, originally served grades 5 and 6 and was located on School Street in Savannah, New York. The Middle School building closed in 2011, moving 5th graders to the Clyde elementary building and 6th graders to the high school building. The middle school was then redefined to consist of grades 6 through 8, and to exist within the same building as the high school. The current principal is Jennifer Kelly.

Former principals
Reason for departure denoted in parentheses
Lynne Baker-Osserman–?-2004 (named Director of Special Education - Waterloo Central School District)
Belinda Crowe–2005-2014 (named Assistant Superintendent of Curriculum and Instruction)

Clyde-Savannah Elementary School

Clyde-Savannah Elementary School, formerly Clyde Elementary School, is located at 212 East DeZeng Street and serves grades Pre-K through 5. The current principal is Kathryn Lumb.

History
The elementary school originally served kindergarten through 4th grade. After the closure of the middle school building, 5th grade was moved to the Clyde elementary building.

Selected former principals
James Sebring–?-2000
William Schmidt–2000–2009
Tom Castellano– 2009-2014

Other information
In April 2008, the district won a Safety Excellence award from the school system's prime insurer, Utica National Insurance Group. Of 340 schools, 54 of them –including Clyde-Savannah– received Titanium Plus status and a $500 award. To earn the award, the district documented 124 safety-related items. Dean of Students Larry Hartwell says, "We've practiced just about everything in the emergency handbook...." The state-mandated Emergency Management Plan includes detailed procedures for bomb threats, chemical spills on the railway in Clyde and severe weather. Clyde-Savannah schools have been set up with the Red Cross to act as emergency centers. If the schools must be evacuated, the district would set up a command post in the bus garage, sending all phone lines through there. If a chemical spill were to occur, the schools can immediately close all air-circulation systems that draw in outside air.

References

External links
Clyde-Savannah Central School District
New York State School Boards Association

School districts in New York (state)
Education in Wayne County, New York
School districts established in 1966